Samuel Bak (born 12 August 1933) is a Lithuanian-American painter and writer who survived the Holocaust and immigrated to Israel in 1948. Since 1993, he has lived in the United States.

Biography
Samuel Bak was born in Wilno (Vilnius), Second Polish Republic, on August 12, 1933. Bak was recognized from an early age as having artistic talent. He describes his family as secular, but proud of their Jewish identity.

By 1939, when Bak was six years old, World War II began, and the city of Vilnius was transferred from Poland to Lithuania. When Vilnius was occupied by the Germans on June 24, 1941, Bak and his family were forced to move into the ghetto. At the age of nine, he held his first exhibition inside the ghetto. Bak and his mother sought refuge in a Benedictine convent where a Catholic nun named Maria Mikulska tried to help them. After returning to the ghetto, they were deported to a forced labour camp, but took shelter again in the convent where they remained in hiding until the end of the war.

By the end of the war, Samuel and his mother were the only members of his extensive family to survive. in July 1944, his father, Jonas, was shot by the Germans, only a few days before Samuel's own liberation. As Bak described the situation, "when in 1944 the Soviets liberated us, we were two among two hundred of Vilna's survivors—from a community that had counted 70 or 80 thousand." Bak and his mother, as pre-war Polish citizens, were allowed to leave Soviet-occupied Vilnius and travel to central Poland, at first settling briefly in Łódź. They soon left Poland and traveled into the American-occupied zone of Germany. 

From 1945 to 1948, he and his mother lived in displaced persons camps in Germany. He spent most of this period at the Landsberg am Lech DP camp in Germany. It was there he painted a self-portrait shortly before repudiating his Bar Mitzvah ceremony. Bak also studied painting in Munich during this period, and painted A Mother and Son, 1947, which evokes some of his dark memories of the Holocaust and escape from Soviet-occupied Poland.

In 1948, Bak and his mother immigrated to Israel. In 1952, he studied art at the Bezalel Academy of Arts and Design in Jerusalem. After serving in the Israel Defense Forces, he continued his studies in Paris from 1956 at the École nationale supérieure des Beaux-Arts He spent various periods of time in Rome, Paris, Switzerland and Israel.

In 1993, he and his wife Josee moved to Boston, where they have been settling permanently.

In 2001, Bak returned to Vilnius for the first time since his youth and has visited his hometown several times since then.

Artistic style and influences

Samuel Bak's art has elements of post-modernism, as he employs different styles and visual vernaculars, i.e. surrealism (Salvador Dali, René Magritte), analytical cubism (Picasso), pop art (Andy Warhol, Roy Lichtenstein) and quotations from the old masters. The artist never paints direct scenes of mass death. Instead, he employs allegory, metaphor and certain artistic devices such as substitution: toys instead of the murdered children who played with them, books, instead of the people who read them. Further devices are quotations of iconographical prototypes, i.e. Michelangelo's Creation of Adam (1511/12) on the Sistine Ceiling or Albrecht Dürer's famous engraving entitled Melancholia (1516). 
In the late 1980s, Bak opened up about his paintings, stating they convey "a sense of a world that was shattered."

In his piece entitled Trains, Bak creates a vast grey landscape with large mounts creating the structure of a train. Massive taper candles burn in the distance further down the train tracks, surrounding an eruption. The smoke from the candles and volcano pour into a sky of dark ominous clouds that lurk over the landscape. Here Bak has created a whole new meaning for "trains". Many of Bak’s pieces incorporate aspects of Jewish culture and the holocaust with a dark and creative twist, such as Shema Yisrael, Alone, and Ghetto. 

In Bak’s 2011 series featuring Adam and Eve (which comprised 125 paintings, drawings and mixed media works), the artist casts the first couple as lone survivors of a biblical narrative of a God who birthed humanity and promised never to destroy it. Unable to make good on the greatest of all literary promises, God becomes another one of the relics that displaced persons carry around with them in the disorienting aftermath of world war. Viewers often describe Bak as a tragedian, but if classical tragedy describes the fall of royal families, Bak narrates the disintegration and disillusion of the chosen people. Bak draws upon the biblical heroes of the Genesis story, yet he is more preoccupied with the visual legacy of the creation story as immortalized by Italian and North Renaissance artists.

Bak continues to deal with the artistic expression of the destruction and dehumanization which make up his childhood memories. He speaks about what are deemed to be the unspeakable atrocities of the Holocaust, though he hesitates to limit the boundaries of his art to the post-Holocaust genre.

Selected publications
 Samuel Bak, Paintings of the Last Decade, A. Kaufman and Paul T. Nagano. Aberbach, New York, 1974.
 Samuel Bak, Monuments to Our Dreams, Rolf Kallenbach. Limes Verlag, Weisbaden & Munich, 1977.
 Samuel Bak, The Past Continues, Samuel Bak and Paul T. Nagano. David R. Godine, Boston, 1988
 Chess as Metaphor in the Art of Samuel Bak, Jean Louis Cornuz. Pucker Art Publications, Boston & C.A. Olsommer, Montreux, 1991.
 Ewiges Licht (Landsberg: A Memoir 1944-1948), Samuel Bak. Jewish Museum, Frankfurt, Germany, 1996.
 Landscapes of Jewish Experience, Lawrence Langer. Pucker Art Publications, Boston & University Press of New England, Hanover, 1997.
 Samuel Bak – Retrospective, Bad Frankenhausen Museum, Bad Frankenhausen, Germany, 1998.
 The Game Continues: Chess in the Art of Samuel Bak, Pucker Art Publications, Boston & Indiana University Press, Bloomington, 2000.
 In A Different Light: The Book of Genesis in the Art of Samuel Bak, Lawrence Langer. Pucker Art Publications, Boston & University of Washington Press, Seattle, 2001.
 The Art of Speaking About the Unspeakable, TV Film by Rob Cooper. Pucker Art Publications, Boston, 2001.
 Between Worlds: Paintings and Drawings by Samuel Bak from 1946-2001, Pucker Art Publications, Boston, 2002.
 Painted in Words: A Memoir, Samuel Bak. Pucker Art Publications, Boston & Indiana University Press, Bloomington, 2002.
 Samuel Bak: Painter of Questions, TV Film by Christa Singer. Toronto, Canada, 2003.
 New Perceptions of Old Appearances in the Art of Samuel Bak, Lawrence Langer. Pucker Art Publications, Boston & Syracuse University Press, Syracuse, 2005.
 Samuel Bak: Life Thereafter, Eva Atlan and Peter Junk. Felix Nussbaum Haus & Rasch, Verlag, Bramsche, Osnabrueck, Germany, 2006.
 Return to Vilna in the Art of Samuel Bak, Lawrence Langer. Pucker Art Publications, Boston & Syracuse University Press, Syracuse, 2007.
 Representing the Irreparable: The Shoah, the Bible, and the Art of Samuel Bak, Danna Nolan Fewell, Gary A. Phillips and Yvonne Sherwood, Eds. Pucker Art Publications, Boston, and Syracuse University Press, Syracuse, 2008.
 Icon of Loss: The Haunting Child of Samuel Bak, Danna Nolan Fewell and Gary A. Phillips. Pucker Art Publications, Boston, and Syracuse University Press, Syracuse, 2009.
 Retrospective Journey into the art of Samuel Bak. Ute Ben Yosef. The South African Jewish Museum. Cape Town, 2013.

Selected museum exhibitions
 Bezalel Museum, Jerusalem, Israel – 1963 
 Tel Aviv Museum, Tel Aviv, Israel – 1963 
 Rose Museum, Brandeis University, Waltham, MA – 1976 
 Germanisches National Museum, Nuremberg, Germany – 1977
 Heidelberg Museum, Heidelberg, Germany – 1977 
 Haifa University, Haifa, Israel – 1978
 Kunstmuseum, Düsseldorf, Germany – 1978 
 Rheinisches Landesmuseum, Bonn, Germany – 1978 
 Kunstmuseum, Wiesbaden, Germany – 1979 
 Stadtgalerie Bamberg, Villa Dessauer, Germany – 1988 
 Koffler Center for the Arts, Toronto, Canada – 1990 
 Dürer Museum, Nuremberg, Germany – 1991
 Temple Judea Museum, Philadelphia, PA – 1991
 Jüdisches Museum, Stadt Frankfurt am Main, Germany – 1993
 Hebrew Union College, Jewish Institute of Religion, New York, NY – 1994
 Janice Charach Epstein Museum and Gallery, West Bloomfield, MI – 1994
 National Catholic Center for Holocaust Education, Seton Hill College, Greensburg, PA – 1995
 Spertus Museum, Chicago, IL – 1995
 B’Nai B’Rith Klutznick National Jewish Museum, Washington, DC – 1997
 Holocaust Museum Houston, Houston, TX – 1997
 Panorama Museum, Bad Frankenhausen, Germany – 1998
 National Museum of Lithuania, Vilnius, Lithuania – 2001
 Snite Museum of Art, Notre Dame University, Notre Dame, IN – 2001
 Florida Holocaust Museum, Saint Petersburg, FL – 2001, 2007, 2009
 Recent Acquisitions, Ben Uri Gallery, London, United Kingdom – 2001-2006 
 Canton Museum of Art, Canton, OH – 2002
 Clark University, Worcester, MA – 2002
 Neues Stadtmuseum, Landsberg am Lech, Germany – 2002
 University of Scranton, Scranton, PA – 2003
 City Hall Gallery, Orlando, FL – 2004
 Texas Tech University, Lubbock, TX – 2004
 Tweed Museum of Art, University of Minnesota, Duluth, MN – 2004
 Felix Nussbaum Haus, Osnabrueck, Germany – 2006
 University of New Hampshire, Durham, NH – 2006
 Yad Vashem Museum, Jerusalem, Israel – 2006
 Mary and Leigh Block Museum of Art, Northwestern University, Evanston, IL – 2008
 Israel & Art: 60 Years through Teddy's Eyes, Ben Uri Gallery, London, United Kingdom – 2008
 Sherwin Miller Museum of Jewish Art, Tulsa, OK – 2008
 Keene State College, Cohen Holocaust Center, Keene, NH – 2008
 Brown University, John Hay Library, Providence, RI – 2009
 Wabash College, Eric Dean Gallery, Crawfordsville, IN – 2009
 DePauw University, The Janet Prindle Institute for Ethics, Greencastle, IN – 2009
 Drew University, Korn Gallery and University Library, Madison, NJ – 2009
 Queensborough Community College, Holocaust Resource Center, Bayside, NY – 2009, 2010
 Holocaust Memorial Center, Zekelman Family Campus, Farmington Hills, MI – 2010
 Holocaust Museum Houston, Houston, TX - 2012
 South African Jewish Museum, Cape Town, South Africa – 2013-2014.
 University of Nebraska at Omaha, Omaha, NE - 2019

References

External links
 Illuminations: The Art of Samuel Bak Resource Collection
 An artwork by Samuel Bak at the Ben Uri site
 University of Minnesota, Center for Holocaust and Genocide Studies
 Samuel Bak, An Arduous Road at Yad Vashem website
 2015 Samuel Bak interview with Jon Niccum, Kansas City Star
 Samuel Bak at the Pucker Gallery, Boston
 2019 WCBV Interview, Someone You Should Know with Maria Stephanos
 
 Catalogue Raisonné www.kunst-archive.net
 Samuel Bak Museum: The Learning Center, University of Nebraska at Omaha
 Samuel Bak Gallery and Learning Center, Holocaust Museum Houston

1933 births
Living people
Artists from Vilnius
American people of Lithuanian-Jewish descent
Bezalel Academy of Arts and Design alumni
Israeli emigrants to the United States
Jewish Israeli artists
Israeli male painters
Israeli people of Lithuanian-Jewish descent
Jewish American artists
Jewish painters
Vilna Ghetto inmates
20th-century Israeli male artists
20th-century American male artists
21st-century Israeli male artists
21st-century American male artists
21st-century American Jews